Rick Bayless (born November 23, 1953) is an American chef and restaurateur who specializes in traditional Mexican cuisine with modern interpretations. He is widely known for his PBS series Mexico: One Plate at a Time. Among his various accolades are a Michelin star, the title of Top Chef Masters, and seven James Beard Awards.

Early life and education 
Bayless was born in Oklahoma City, Oklahoma, into a family of restaurateurs and grocers specializing in local barbecue. He is the younger brother of sports journalist and television personality Skip Bayless. Having begun his culinary training as a youth, Bayless broadened his interests to include regional Mexican cooking as an undergraduate student of Spanish and Latin American culture. After finishing his undergraduate education at the University of Oklahoma, he obtained his master's degree in linguistics at the University of Michigan. He nearly completed a PhD in anthropological linguistics at Michigan when he decided to leave his studies to concentrate on his nascent cooking career. While at Michigan, he met his future wife and frequent culinary collaborator Deann. They married in 1979.

Professional career

TV Host and author 
After hosting the 26-part PBS television series Cooking Mexican in 1978–1979, Bayless dedicated over six years to culinary research in Mexico, culminating in 1987 with the publication of his Authentic Mexican: Regional Cooking from the Heart of Mexico, which Craig Claiborne described as "the greatest contribution to the Mexican table imaginable."

Following Authentic Mexican, Bayless has written a number of highly regarded cookbooks (see §Awards and accolades), often co-authoring with Deann and his daughter, Lanie. Perhaps his best-known cookbook is his 2001 James Beard Foundation award-winning Mexico: One Plate at a Time, a companion to the first season of Bayless' PBS television show of the same name. At least one other of his cookbooks, Mexican Everyday (2005), provides recipes that directly tie into the show. 

In 2003, PBS began broadcasting Bayless' television series Mexico: One Plate at a Time. Bayless and the show have been nominated for several Daytime Emmy Awards. Bayless was personally nominated twice for a Daytime Emmy Award for Outstanding Lifestyle/Culinary Host for his work on the show in 2012 and again in 2017.  One Plate at a Time's director, Scott Dummler, was nominated for Outstanding Directing in a Lifestyle/Culinary Program in 2012, and the show was nominated overall for Outstanding Culinary Program in 2016.

Seasons of Mexico: One Plate at a Time sometimes focus on the cuisine of a specific region: for example, season 8 was centered around cuisine from Tijuana and the Baja Peninsula, season 9 focused on Oaxaca, and season 11 was produced entirely on the Yucatán Peninsula.

Chef and restaurateur 
Before opening his restaurant, Bayless began his career as a professional chef in 1980 as the executive chef at Lopez y Gonzalez in Cleveland Heights, Ohio. In 1987, Bayless and his wife Deann opened Frontera Grill in Chicago, specializing in contemporary regional Mexican cuisine, with special emphasis on the varied cuisines of the Oaxaca region. In 1989, Rick and Deann opened Topolobampo, one of Chicago's first fine-dining Mexican restaurants. As of 2019, Topolobampo has 1 Michelin star.

In 1995, Rick and his partners started the Frontera Foods line of prepared food products. They sold Frontera Foods to ConAgra Foods in 2016. Bayless remains involved as a product-development advisor to the brand. The Frontera restaurants were not included in the deal.

He was one of the founding members of Chefs Collaborative in support of environmentally sound agricultural practices and is active in Share Our Strength, the nation's largest hunger advocacy organization. Often his TV shows emphasize the responsible use of foodstuffs with a focus on sustainable farming and cooking.

Rick Bayless is a restaurant consultant and teaches authentic Mexican cooking throughout the United States. He is a visiting staff member at the Culinary Institute of America and leads cooking and cultural tours to Mexico. Fluent in Spanish, Bayless favors coastal (seafood) fare and dishes that feature traditional Mexican and pre-Columbian Incan, Mayan, and Aztecan ingredients native to Mexico, like chocolate, peppers, and vanilla bean.

Bayless and his staff also began the Frontera Farmer Foundation in 2003. This foundation was set up to support Chicago-area local farmers by offering capital improvement grants. , more than $400,000 has been given to local family farms.

In December 2007, Bayless opened Frontera Fresco restaurant inside Macy's Union Square store in San Francisco. He later opened Frontera Fresco restaurants inside Macy's State Street store in Chicago, Macy's in nearby Skokie on the campus of Northwestern University and in Walt Disney World. The San Francisco restaurant closed in April 2014. The Northwestern outlet closed in June 2018 at the end of the school year.

In 2008, Bayless was widely considered to be a serious contender for the position of White House Executive Chef under the administration of Barack Obama.

In 2010, after spending significant time at local Mexican dining spots, Bayless made his Los Angeles debut running the kitchen at the Red O.

Bayless was guest chef for the May 19, 2010 White House state dinner honoring Mexican President Felipe Calderón and his wife Margarita Zavala.

Other media appearances 
In 2005, Bayless competed on Iron Chef America and lost by one point to Iron Chef Bobby Flay on what was the first broadcast episode of season 1, with American bison meat as the secret ingredient.

Bayless appeared as a guest judge in episode 3 of Season 4's Top Chef, judging both the quickfire and elimination challenges. He later became a contestant in episode 3 of the first season of Top Chef Masters, winning that episode and advancing to the Champion's round. In the championship round, he won the title of Top Chef Master on August 19, 2009.

In 2012, Bayless ventured into the world of theatre, partnering with Lookingglass Theatre Company in Chicago to put on the play Rick Bayless in Cascabel, which Bayless created along with Tony Hernandez and Heidi Stillman. The show opened on March 21, 2012, to favorable reviews and ran through April 29.

Current restaurants
 Frontera Grill (Chicago)
 Topolobampo (Chicago) – 1 Michelin star as of the 2015 guide
 XOCO (Chicago)
 Tortas Frontera (O'Hare International Airport – Chicago) – co-owned with Jollibee Foods Corporation and other shareholders.
 Red O (3 locations in California)
 Frontera Cocina (Lake Buena Vista, Florida)
 Bar Sótano (Chicago)
 Tortazo (Chicago)

Awards and accolades
 Best New Chef of 1988, Food & Wine
 Best American Chef: Midwest 1991, James Beard Foundation
 National Chef of the Year 1995, James Beard Foundation
 Outstanding Chef 1995, James Beard Foundation for Frontera Grill/Topolombampo
 Chef of the Year 1995, International Association of Culinary Professionals (IACP)
 Cookbook of the Year, 1996, IACP, for Rick Bayless's Mexican Kitchen
 Cookbook of the Year, 1996, National Julia Child Cookbook Awards, for Rick Bayless's Mexican Kitchen
 Cookbook of the Year, 1996, Chicago Tribune, for Rick Bayless's Mexican Kitchen
 Humanitarian of the year 1998, James Beard Foundation
 Cookbook of the Year in 2001, James Beard Foundation, for Mexico: One Plate at a Time
 Best Chef Midwest (CHICAGO) of 2002, James Beard Foundation
 Who's Who of American Food and Drink
 Humanitarian of the Year IACP 2007
 Frontera Grill won Outstanding Restaurant from the James Beard Foundation 2007
 Winner, Top Chef Masters Season 1 on Bravo Cable Network, September 2009
 Recipient 2011 Golden Beet Award from The Illinois Stewardship Alliance in the category "Community Food Projects" for his work with the Frontera Farmer Foundation and his support of local and sustainable agriculture.
 Frontera Grill was ranked the third-best casual dining restaurant in the world by the International Herald Tribune
 Insignia of the Order of the Aztec Eagle, 2012
 Julia Child Award from The Julia Child Foundation for Gastronomy and the Culinary Arts, 2016
 Topolobampo won 2017 Outstanding Restaurant from the James Beard Foundation.

Bibliography

 Authentic Mexican: Regional Cooking from the Heart of Mexico (1987)
 Rick Bayless's Mexican Kitchen: Capturing the Vibrant Flavors of a World-Class Cuisine (1996)
 Salsas That Cook: Using Classic Salsas to Enliven Our Favorite Dishes (1998)
 Mexico: One Plate at a Time (book) (2000)
 Mexico: One Plate at a Time (television series) (2003–2019)
 Rick and Lanie's Excellent Kitchen Adventures (2004)
 Mexican Everyday (2005)
 Fiesta at Rick's: Fabulous Food for Great Times with Friends (2010)
 Frontera: Margaritas, Guacamoles, and Snacks (2012)
 More Mexican Everyday (2015)

References

External links
 
 

1953 births
Living people
20th-century American male writers
20th-century American non-fiction writers
21st-century American male writers
21st-century American non-fiction writers
American cookbook writers
American male chefs
American male non-fiction writers
American restaurateurs
American television chefs
Chefs from California
Chefs from Chicago
Chefs from Michigan
Chefs from Oklahoma
Chefs of Mexican cuisine
James Beard Foundation Award winners
Northwest Classen High School alumni
PBS people
Television personalities from Oklahoma City
Top Chef winners
University of Michigan College of Literature, Science, and the Arts alumni
University of Oklahoma alumni
Writers from Chicago
Writers from Michigan
Writers from Oklahoma City
International Association of Culinary Professionals award winners